These are the international rankings of Grenada

International rankings

Grenada